William Mansell Hansen (March 2, 1911 – June 23, 1975) was an American actor, active in film, television and the stage.

Career
A founding member of the Actors Studio in New York, Hansen originated the role of Mr. Lundie in the original Broadway production of Brigadoon in 1947, and the role of Royal Addams in original Broadway production of The Member of the Wedding in 1950. He also appeared in the role of Secretary Swensen in Fail Safe, and as one of America's founding fathers, Caesar Rodney, in the film 1776.

Filmography

References

External links 

 William Hansen at Internet Off-Broadway Database
 

1911 births
1975 deaths
Male actors from Washington, D.C.
American male film actors
American male stage actors
American male television actors
20th-century American male actors